Irina Topal (born 19 December 1998) is a Moldovan footballer who plays as a midfielder and has appeared for the Moldova women's national team.

Career
Topal has been capped for the Moldova national team, appearing for the team during the 2019 FIFA Women's World Cup qualifying cycle.

International goals

References

External links
 
 
 

1998 births
Living people
Moldovan women's footballers
Women's association football midfielders
Moldova women's international footballers
Moldovan expatriate women's footballers
Moldovan expatriate sportspeople in Romania
Expatriate women's footballers in Romania